Geneva's Shear Perfection Barber & Beauty Salon was a barber shop and salon in northeast Portland, Oregon's King neighborhood, in the United States. The shop was located along Martin Luther King Jr. Boulevard and has been described as a "cornerstone" of the city's African-American community. Geneva's closed in 2020, during the COVID-19 pandemic.

See also
 COVID-19 pandemic in Portland, Oregon

References

2020 disestablishments in Oregon
African-American history in Portland, Oregon
Barber shops
King, Portland, Oregon